The 1974 Individual Speedway World Championship was the 29th edition of the official World Championship to determine the world champion rider.

Sweden's own Anders Michanek scored a 15-point maximum to claim his only Individual world title in front of a capacity crowd at the Ullevi stadium in Göteborg. Four time champion Ivan Mauger finished second on 11 points after winning a run-off with Swede Sören Sjösten who also scored 11. With the defending champion Jerzy Szczakiel not qualifying after finishing last in the 2nd Continental Semi-final, the only other World Champion in the field was Denmark's Ole Olsen who suffered a horror night, finishing second in his first ride before falling in his second and not being able to contest the rest of the meeting.

Format changes
The format of the Championship changed for the 1974 event. This time the Swedish riders were allowed five places in the World Final to be held in Sweden. All other nations had to go through the European Final route to provide the remaining 11 riders for the World Final.

First round
British/Commonwealth Qualifying - 16 to British/Commonwealth Final
Scandinavian Qualifying - 16 to Nordic Final
Continental Qualifying - 16 to Continental Final
Swedish Qualifying - 16 to Swedish Final

British/Commonwealth Qualifying

Scandinavian Qualifying

Swedish Qualifying

Continental Qualifying

Second round
British/Commonwealth Final - 10 to British/Commonwealth/Nordic final
Nordic Final -  6 to British/Commonwealth/Nordic final

British/Commonwealth Final
June 12, 1974
 Coventry
 First 10 to British-Nordic Final plus 1 reserve

Nordic Final
9 June 1974
 Tampere
 First 6 to British-Nordic Final plus 1 reserve

Third round
British/Commonwealth/Nordic Final - 8 to European Final
Continental Final - 8 to European Final

Continental Final
 June 23, 1974
  Tolyatti
 First 8 to European Final

British/Commonwealth/Nordic Final
August 4, 1974
 Fredericia
 First 8 to European Final

Fourth round
Swedish Finals - 5 to World Final
European Final - 11 to World Final

Swedish Finals
Three races held on 28 May at Stockholm, 29 May at Norrköping and 30 May in Göteborg

European Final
 August 31, 1974
  Wembley

World Final
September 6, 1974
 Göteborg, Ullevi

References

External links

The event at SVT's open archive 

1974
World Individual
Speedway competitions in Sweden
1974 in Swedish motorsport